Innercity Griots is the second studio album by American hip hop group Freestyle Fellowship. It was released on April 28, 1993 on 4th & B'way Records and distributed through Island Records.

Critical reception

Nathan Bush of AllMusic gave the album 5 stars out of 5, praising the group's creativity and range as well as the album's production, which he felt showed an improvement from their previous effort. Jihad Hassan Muhammad of The Dallas Weekly commented that "they gave an unlikely musical offering at the time when everything was gangs and sets thrown as far as hip-hop was concerned in Los Angeles."

In 2012, The Daily Californian included it on the "10 Albums for the Hip-Hop Layman" list. In 2013, Spin included it on its list of the 50 best rap albums of 1993. In 2015, NME placed it at number 51 on its list of the "100 Lost Albums You Need to Know".

Track listing

Personnel
Information taken from the liner notes.
 Freestyle Fellowship: Myka 9, Aceyalone, Peace, and Self Jupiter.
 The Earthquake Brothers: The Jamm Messenger D, Mathmattiks, and The Mighty O-Roc.

 Freestyle Fellowship – vocals, production, mixing
 The Earthquake Brothers – production, mixing
 Bambawar – production, mixing
 Daddy-O – vocals, production, engineering
 Edman – production
 JMD – bass guitar, timpani, drums, percussion, production
 Kevin O'Neal – upright bass, production
 Kim Buie – executive production
 Kedar Massenburg – executive production, mixing
 Matt Hyde – engineering, mixing
 Rich Herrera – engineering, mixing
 Dawud – engineering
 Aceyalone – mixing
 Ed Lawson – mixing
 Robert Harris – bass guitar
 Don Littleton – percussion
 Marvin McDaniel – acoustic guitar
 Rodney Millon – guitar
 Onaje Murray – vibraphone
 Tom Ralls – trombone
 Christy Smith – bass guitar, upright bass
 Alfred Threats – bass guitar
 Jon Williams – trumpet
 Randall Willis – tenor saxophone, saxophone, flute
 DJ Kiilu – turntables
 Mathmattiks – turntables
 Spoon – vocals
 Cockney "O" Dire – vocals
 Archie – vocals
 Volume 10 – vocals
 Ganja K Chronic – vocals

References

External links
 

1993 albums
Freestyle Fellowship albums
4th & B'way Records albums
Island Records albums